Mary Jean Reimer (born 22 May 1964), also known as Yung Jing-Jing, is a Hong Kong solicitor and actress. She has American-Chinese-Vietnamese ancestry.

Early life and film career
Reimer was born in South Vietnam (or the United States) to an American father and Hoa mother. Her family moved to Hong Kong in 1965. She began her acting career with the TV series The Youth (年青人) and in 1980, she co-starred with Danny Chan in Clifford Choi's youth drama Encore (喝采). She reached her foremost fame with fantasy Wuxia films, among which is Little Dragon Maiden (楊過與小龍女) where she played the title character Xiaolongnü. Reimer ended her acting career after marriage to Lau Kar-leung in 1984. She has two daughters, Jeanne, born 1986, and Rosemary, born 1989, with him.

Later career
Reimer started to work as an insurance consultant in 1989. She graduated from the University of Hong Kong School of Professional and Continuing Education in 1996 and began her career as a solicitor after her exam for her insurance agent qualifications has sections with regards to law, in which she scored 92 points. Reimer owned her business Reimer & Partners. In 2014, she retired after developing hypothyroidism from the physical and emotional stress from being a solicitor.

Reimer was also renowned as a TV and radio host and as a freelance writer with a newspaper column, Dangerous Persons.

Reimer is a practising Buddhist who used to sit on the board of Ting Wai Monastery. She exposed Sik Chi Ding, the abbess, for mishandling millions of Hong Kong dollars in donations and sham marriages with two monks for residency purposes. She has also been active in exposing the practice of fake monks begging in Hong Kong and foreign cities.

Reimer married her longtime boyfriend Sean Eric Mclean Hotung in May 2018.

References

External links
Mary Jean Reimer Lau official website
Yung Jing-Jing at the Hong Kong Movie Database
Mary Jean Reimer at Hong Kong Cinemagic

Living people
1964 births
Alumni of the University of Hong Kong
American emigrants to Hong Kong
Hong Kong people of American descent
Hong Kong people of Hoa descent
Hong Kong film actresses
Solicitors of Hong Kong
Hong Kong women lawyers
20th-century Hong Kong actresses

Vietnamese people of American descent